Soea is a commune (khum) of Mongkol Borei District in Banteay Meanchey Province in western Cambodia.

Villages

 Ta Mau
 Ansam Chek
 Tnaot
 Buor
 Bos Laok
 Soea
 Boeng Touch
 Phlov Damrei Leu
 Phlov Damrei Kraom
 Ou Soea
 Kouk Samraong
 Balang Chrey
 Ou Choub Thmey

References

Communes of Banteay Meanchey province
Mongkol Borey District